The following is an episode list for the Canadian drama series Instant Star. The series premiered on September 15, 2004 and ended on July 28, 2008.

Seasons

Season 1 (2004–05)

Season 2 (2006)

Season 3 (2007)

Season 3 short films

Season 4 (2008)

Instant Star Minis

Season 3
Starting in Season 3, Instant Star Mini webisodes have appeared on The N.com's The Click.
 "If I Should Stay" - Tommy shows Jude how to find her everything.
 "I'm a Degrassi, I'm an Instant Star" - Degrassi vs. Instant Star.
 "The Flame" - Karma makes Tommy her own by sexing up her new single.
 "Warrior Princess" - Sadie is a ninja. Like a real, honest to God, nun chuck wielding, kick-your-ass-with-a-pole ninja.
  "Geometry Of Love" - Jamie puts on a lab coat and dissects the sordid steaming mass of Instant Star romance.
 "Instant Noir" - Gams, hats, dames, and Tommy kissing Jude. Wait, what are "gams" again?
 "My Best-Friend's Wedding" - Imagine the not-too-distant future... It's Jude's wedding day... So who the hell is she marrying?
 "8 Kilometers" - Lose yourself. No seriously, lose yourself before Spiederman starts rapping.
 "Hollywood Undercover" - Jude Harrison is secretly married and on drugs and viciously assaulting innocent reporters! It's all true! Kind of!
 "What You Need" - Watch Spiederman's first music video.
 "Hollywood Undercover 2" - That Jude. When she's not carousing with babes, she's cavorting with hotties.
 "Tommy and Portia" - Tommy and Portia spiral downward into mistrust and death.

Season 4
 "Higher Ground" - Mini webisode that features the brand new song Higher Ground.
 "I Just Wanted Your Love" - Nothing's like singing a song about the old and good love in the kitchen.
 "That Was Us" - Flashback about the good moments between Jude and Tommy.
 "Remind Yourself" - Spiederman Mind Explosion's new song, featuring the over-possessive Karma.
 "Live Like Music" - Not just hear it, live it.
 "Ultraviolet" - First mini performance of the 4th season by Jude, with Tommy and Jamie watching in two different places.
 "The Music" - Imagine that Jude never won Instant Star contest, and she plays on the streets with SME.
 "Perfect" - It's Jude in gold sequins and the SME in crazy weirdness.
 "Here We Go Again" - Jude and Tommy's first duet sets the woods on fire.
 "Ghost of Mine" - Karma, Spied, Sadie and Blu go Dreamgirls-style.
 "2 a.m." - The snow falls, Jude sings and Tommy wants to recover their love.

Instant Star: On the set

Season 3
Along with Instant Star mini's, The N.com takes you backstage of Instant Star. Also appearing on The N.com's The Click.

  "Time to Sing Again" - Be there as Alexz steps on stage to perform the first song from the new season of Instant Star.
  "Tim and Alexz Time" - What Tim and Alexz have together no one can take away. Not that anyone's tried.
  "20 Minute Rain Delay" - The cast shot the boob-out bar mitzvah at a real celeb's house. Whose house was it is top secret. But after 20 minutes standing in the rain, they told us anyway.
 "One Flew Over the Photo Shoot" - Nothing says "photo shoot day" like Tim Rozon doing the cabbage patch.
 "Going Out With a Bang" - The thing about TV is, when you need to shoot a deadly car crash, you can't actually kill anybody.
 "On the Steps of a Mansion" - Tim Rozon proves it's not how well you sing, it's how well you do The Grab.
"A Day in the Country" - Ahh, the Instant Star life: relaxing in a verdant meadow, napping with Tim Rozon, busting up $100,000 sports cars...
"The Making of 'What You Need'" - It's true: Tyler Kyte really did write and perform Spiederman's first solo record. It's also true that Alexz Johnson's dressing room is way nicer than his.
"Swing Kids" - For Jude's 18th birthday, she got just what she wanted. Namely, the Degrassi gym converted into a lush 1930s nightclub in less than three days.
"12:10 AM" - It's the middle of the night, but the day's not over. How can the cast rock out when they've been working for 17 hours? Also: hear the new Jude song "Unravelling".
"The Power to Rock"- You've got dozens of screaming fans and Alexz on stage. There's never any question who owns the room. See her break out the new Jude song "The Breakdown".
"Cory Sings" - Cory Lee is on stage singing her new track "No Shirt No Shoes", but nobody has any idea what else is going on.
"Time To Say Goodbye"- On the last day of the season, there are secret-goodbye messages, hugs, and a rooftop performance by Alexz Johnson.

External links 
 List of Instant Star episodes at IMDb.
 Official Instant Star Website (CTV-Canada)
 The N's Instant Star site (U.S.)

Instant Star